The Ralph Bates Pancreatic Cancer Research Fund is a UK-based charity (number 1007819) set up in 1992 in memory of British actor Ralph Bates, who died of the disease six weeks after diagnosis.  The main objective of the fund is to provide grants for research into causes, diagnosis and treatments of pancreatic cancer.  The grants enable equipment to be purchased or leased and cover the employment costs and expenses of researchers.

Fundraising
The Fund receives no direct Government assistance, except for Gift Aid on qualifying donations. All donations are from private individuals and institutions such as Freemasons' Lodges, with a small amount deriving from corporations.  Golf Days, sponsored runs such as the London Marathon, and other similar events all help to generate funds.

With the exception of some miscellaneous administration expenditure such as postage and stationery, fund raising costs and annual audit fees, all donations are used for the main objective of the Fund.
In the Financial Year to March 2002, 96% of all donations were used for Charitable purposes.
In the year to March 2003, the figure reduced to 87%, due to a reduction in donations received for the year.
to March 2004, 92%
to March 2005, 94%,
to March 2006, 97%.
to March 2007, 95%,
to March 2008, 87%, due to a reduction in donations received for the year.
to March 2009, 98%.

Funded research
The charity mainly funds research at St George's University of London, where work is currently focused on the effectiveness of drugs or a combination of drugs on pancreatic cancer cells and also their effectiveness in inhibiting cell resistance to chemotherapy.  The research has resulted in a high impact publication in the International Journal of Cancer, showing that a commonly used antibiotic, Doxycycline, is capable of inducing cell death in human pancreatic cancer cells.

Other funded research work at St George’s has concentrated on the effect of protein control on cancer cells, where a naturally occurring hormone-like agent has been identified as having potential as a cancer treatment but which has no effect on healthy cells.

Medical equipment
In October 2007 the Fund entered into an operating lease for the supply and installation of Endoscopic Ultrasound equipment in the Oncology Department at St George’s.  This equipment enables earlier diagnosis of pancreatic cancer and will provides data and samples to support the research work.

Trustees
The Trustees meet as necessary to review the work of the Fund and its financial status. None receive remuneration for their services or reimbursement of expenses.  The Trustees are

Mr John Sullivan OBE (patron)
Mrs Virginia Bates
Dr John Glees MD, FRCR
Mr Michael Knight MS, FRCS
Mr Patrick Baly FCA
Mr John Sherry
Mr Les Biggs ACIS (Secretary).

The Patron of the Fund, John Sullivan OBE, is the writer of the BBC TV series Dear John, in which Ralph Bates starred, and Only Fools and Horses. Virginia Bates, Ralph Bates’ widow, plays an active part in raising funds.

See also 
 Cancer in the United Kingdom

References

External links
 Official website

Cancer organisations based in the United Kingdom
Health charities in the United Kingdom
Organizations established in 1992
1992 establishments in the United Kingdom